Sinogastromyzon hsiashiensis is a species of ray-finned fish in the genus Sinogastromyzon. It is endemic to China; its type locality is in Guizhou. It grows to  SL.

References

Sinogastromyzon
Freshwater fish of China
Endemic fauna of China
Taxa named by Fang Ping-Wen
Fish described in 1931